Stephen P. Hinshaw (born December 1, 1952) is an American psychologist whose contributions lie in the areas of developmental psychopathology and combating the stigma that surrounds mental illness. He has authored more than 325 scientific articles and chapters as well as 14 authored and edited books. Currently, he is Professor (and former department chair) in the Department of Psychology at the University of California, Berkeley, and Professor In Residence and Vice Chair for Child and Adolescent Psychology in the Department of Psychiatry at the University of California, San Francisco. His work focuses on child and adolescent mental disorders, clinical interventions, mechanisms of change in psychopathology, and stigma prevention efforts, with a specialization in ADHD and other externalizing behavioral disorders.

Early life 

Stephen P. Hinshaw was born on December 1, 1952, in Columbus, Ohio. He was the oldest child in the family; his sister, Sally P. Hinshaw, is 15 months younger. It wasn't until he was 18 that Hinshaw's father, the eminent philosopher Virgil Hinshaw Jr., let him in on a family secret, which had been explicitly forbidden from discussion by Virgil's doctors. Once his father's 'madness' — a lifelong, cyclic psychotic illness misdiagnosed as schizophrenia, which Hinshaw subsequently corrected as bipolar disorder — was out in the open, Hinshaw's career trajectory moved toward clinical psychology. Subsequent discussions revealed a history of involuntary hospitalizations and other brutal treatments, fueling Hinshaw's lifelong passion for understanding vulnerable children and eradicating mental illness stigma.

Academic career 
Hinshaw attended Harvard University from 1970 to 1974, concentrating in psychology and social relations. After graduating, he directed a residential summer camp for children with serious disabilities (Camp Freedom) and a day school program operating out of Massachusetts Mental Health Center (Therapeutic Center) for children who had been excluded from public school settings. He went on to earn his Ph.D. in clinical psychology at UCLA, before serving as a postdoctoral fellow at the University of California, San Francisco. He was a visiting lecturer at UC Berkeley, an assistant professor at UCLA and an assistant, associate, and currently professor at UC Berkeley and UC San Francisco.

He has served as Principal Investigator for the Berkeley site in the Multimodal Treatment Study of Children with ADHD (MTA Study) and founded the Berkeley Girls with ADHD Longitudinal Study (BGALS), the largest study of girls with this condition in existence.  Contributions from the latter investigation include delineating the serious risk for self-harm (suicide attempts and non-suicidal self-injury) in girls with ADHD as they mature into late adolescence and early adulthood. Among other consultantships and affiliations, he serves on the scientific board of Glenn Close's mental health nonprofit Bring Change 2 Mind, as an advisor and storyteller for the play The Manic Monologues, and as co-chair of the Scientific Research Council of the Child Mind Institute.

Accomplishments 

The primary focus of his research is externalizing behavior dimensions and disorders, particularly ADHD; family, peer, and neuropsychological risk factors; mechanisms of change via clinical trials; and the stigmatization of mental illness.  His work has featured the interplay between psychobiological vulnerability and family. gender and peer-related risk factors and impairments, emphasizing transactional models of influence.  His work on randomized clinical trials of pharmacologic and psychosocial interventions for children with attention-related and impulsive behavior problems emphasizes understanding the mechanisms underlying clinically significant change, particularly family processes. He has been awarded numerous federal grants for his investigations.

Hinshaw was documented as one of the 10 most productive scholars in the field of clinical psychology across the past decade. From 2009 to 2014 he was editor of Psychological Bulletin, the most cited journal in general psychology. He is a fellow of the Association for Psychological Science, the American Psychological Association, and the American Association for the Advancement of Science. His research efforts have been recognized by California's Distinguished Scientific Contribution in Psychology Award (2009), the Distinguished Scientist Award from the Society for a Science of Clinical Psychology (2015), and the James McKeen Cattell Award from the Association for Psychological Science (2016) —its highest award, for a lifetime of outstanding contributions to applied psychological research—and the Distinguished Scientific Contributions to Child Development Award (2017) from the Society for Research in Child Development.

Hinshaw's research is regularly featured in various mainstream media outlets including ABC World News Tonight, CBS Evening News, CNN, Huffington Post, NBC Today Show, New York Times, Newsweek, Oakland Tribune, Psychology Today, People Magazine, San Francisco Chronicle, The Economist, Time, Wall Street Journal, and Washington Post.

He is a Fellow of the American Association for the Advancement of Science, the American Psychological Association, and the Association for Psychological Science.  As a trainee and student, he received the R.E. Harris Award: Outstanding Clinical Psychology Fellow, Langley Porter Institute, UC San Francisco; the UCLA Alumni Association Distinguished Scholar Award winner (outstanding graduate student campus-wide); and, at Harvard, the Ames Award, Detur Prize, John Harvard Scholarship, Harvard College Scholarship, and National Merit Scholarship.

In 2001, Hinshaw received the Distinguished Teaching Award from UC Berkeley's Division of Social Sciences. His Teaching Company ('Great Lecture') series, "Origins of the Human Mind," was released in 2010.

Regarding his 2007 book, The Mark of Shame, Stigma of Mental Illness and an Agenda for Change, the New England Journal of Medicine review stated the following: "Hinshaw's skill as a writer cannot be overstated. He uses a mixture of technical and lay language to paint a picture of stigma across the ages that is thoroughly enjoyable to read despite its often distressing content. In addition to being a professor of psychology, Hinshaw comes across as a passionate historian and humanitarian."  Regarding his 2014 book with R. Scheffler, The ADHD Explosion, Publishers Weekly called it "…complex, thought-provoking, and urgent."

Bibliography 
 Hinshaw, S. P. (2017).  Another kind of madness: A journey through the stigma and hope of mental illness.  New York: St. Martin's
 Beauchaine, T. P., & Hinshaw, S. P. (Eds.) (2017).  Child and adolescent psychopathology (3rd ed.).  Hoboken, NJ: Wiley.
 Guendelman, M., Owens, E. B., Galan, C., Gard, A., & Hinshaw, S. P. (2016).  Early adult correlates of maltreatment in girls with ADHD:  Increased risk for internalizing problems and suicidality.  Development and Psychopathology, 26, 1–14.
 Meza, J., Owens, E. B., & Hinshaw, S. P. (2016). Response inhibition, peer preference and victimization, and self-harm: Longitudinal associations in young adult women with and without ADHD.  Journal of Abnormal Child Psychology, 44, 323–334. 
 Owens, E. B., & Hinshaw, S. P. (2016).  Childhood conduct problems and young adult outcomes among women with childhood ADHD.   Journal of Abnormal Psychology, 125, 220-232.
 Hinshaw, S. P. (2015).  Developmental psychopathology, ontogenic process models, gene-environment interplay, and brain development: An emerging synthesis.  Journal of Abnormal Psychology, 124, 771-775.
 Hinshaw, S. P., & Arnold, L. E. (2015).  Attention deficit hyperactivity disorder, multimodal treatment, and longitudinal outcome: Evidence, paradox, and challenge.  WIRES Cognitive Science, 6, 39–52.
 Owens, E. B., Cardoos, S., & Hinshaw, S. P. (2015).  Developmental progressions and gender differences among individuals with ADHD.  In R. A. Barkley (Ed.), Attention deficit hyperactivity disorder:  A handbook for diagnosis and treatment (4th ed.).  New York: Guilford Press.
 Murman, N., Buckingham, K. C. E., Fontilea, P., Villanueva, R., Leventhal, B., & Hinshaw, S. P. (2014). Let's Erase the Stigma (LETS): A quasi-experimental evaluation of adolescent-led school groups intended to reduce mental illness stigma. Child and Youth Care Forum, 43, 631–637.
 Hinshaw, S. P., & Scheffer, R. M. (2014).  The ADHD explosion: Myths, medication, money, and today's push for performance.  New York: Oxford University Press.
 Swanson, E. N., Owens, E. B., & Hinshaw, S. P. (2014).  Pathways to self-harmful behavior in young women with and without ADHD: A longitudinal investigation of mediating factors.  Journal of Child Psychology and Psychiatry, 44, 505-515. 
 Hinshaw, S. P., Owens, E. B., Zalecki, C., Huggins, S. P., Montenegro-Nevado, A., Schrodek, E., & Swanson, E. N. (2012).  Prospective follow-up of girls with attention-deficit hyperactivity disorder into young adulthood: Continuing impairment includes elevated risk for suicide attempts and self-injury.  Journal of Consulting and Clinical Psychology, 80, 1041-1051.
 Hinshaw, S. P., Scheffler, R. M., Fulton, B., Aase, H., Banaschewski, T., Cheng, W., Holte, A., Levy, F., Mattos, P., Sadeh, A., Sergeant, J., Taylor, E., & Weiss, M.  (2011). International variation in treatment procedures for attention-deficit/hyperactivity disorder: Social context and recent trends.  Psychiatric Services, 62, 459-464.
 Miller, M., & Hinshaw, S. P. (2010). Does childhood executive function predict adolescent functional outcomes in girls with ADHD? Journal of Abnormal Child Psychology, 38, 315–326.
 Hinshaw, S. P., with Kranz, R. (2009). The Triple Bind: Saving our teenage girls from today's pressures. New York: Random House/Ballantine.
 Owens, E. B., Hinshaw, S. P., Lee, S. S., & Lahey, B. B. (2009). Few girls with childhood attention-deficit/hyperactivity disorder show positive adjustment during adolescence. Journal of Clinical Child and Adolescent Psychology, 38, 1–12.
 Hinshaw, S. P., & Stier, A. (2008). Stigma in relation to mental disorders. Annual Review of Clinical Psychology, 4, 269–293.
 Mikami, A. Y., Hinshaw, S. P., Patterson, K. A., & Lee, J. C. (2008). Eating pathology among adolescent girls with attention-deficit/hyperactivity disorder. Journal of Abnormal Psychology, 117, 225–235.
 Hinshaw, S. P. (2007). The mark of shame: Stigma of mental illness and an agenda for change. New York: Oxford University Press.
 Hinshaw, S. P., Owens, E. B., Sami, N., & Fargeon, S. (2006). Prospective follow-up of girls with attention-deficit/hyperactivity disorder into adolescence: Evidence for continuing cross-domain impairment. Journal of Consulting and Clinical Psychology, 74, 489–499.
 Hinshaw, S. P. (2002). Preadolescent girls with attention-deficit/hyperactivity disorder: I. Background characteristics, comorbidity, cognitive and social functioning, and parenting practices. Journal of Consulting and Clinical Psychology, 70, 1086–1098.
 Hinshaw, S. P. (2002). Intervention research, theoretical mechanisms, and causal processes related to externalizing behavior patterns. Development and Psychopathology, 14, 789–818.
 Hinshaw, S. P., Carte, E. T., Sami, N., Treuting, J. J., & Zupan, B. A. (2002). Preadolescent girls with attention-deficit/hyperactivity disorder: II. Neuropsychological performance in relation to subtypes and individual classification. Journal of Consulting and Clinical Psychology, 70, 1099–1111.
 Hinshaw, S. P., Owens, E. B., Wells, K. C., Kraemer, H. C., Abikoff, H. B., Arnold, L. E., et al. (2000). Family processes and treatment outcome in the MTA: Negative/ineffective parenting practices in relation to multimodal treatment. Journal of Abnormal Child Psychology, 28, 555–568.
 Hinshaw, S. P., & Cicchetti, D. (2000). Stigma and mental disorder: Conceptions of illness, public attitudes, personal disclosure, and social policy.  Development and Psychopathology, 12, 555–598. 
 Hinshaw, S. P., & Melnick, S. (1995). Peer relationships in children with attention-deficit hyperactivity disorder with and without comorbid aggression.  Development and Psychopathology, 7, 627–647. 
 Hinshaw, S. P. (1992). Externalizing behavior problems and academic underachievement in childhood and adolescence: Causal relationships and underlying mechanisms.  Psychological Bulletin, 111, 127–155.
 Hinshaw, S. P. (1987). On the distinction between attentional deficits/hyperactivity and conduct problems/aggression in child psychopathology.  Psychological Bulletin, 101, 443‑463.

References

External links 
 University of San Francisco, California, Department of Psychiatry Leadership 
 UC Berkeley | Benioff Children's Hospital | UC San Francisco Child Research Central
 The Manic Monologues, Leadership

Living people
1952 births
21st-century American psychologists
University of California, Berkeley College of Letters and Science faculty
Harvard University alumni
University of California, Los Angeles alumni
People from Columbus, Ohio
20th-century American psychologists